Euphalacra semisecta is a moth in the family Drepanidae. The first known description is by William Warren in 1922, although Warren attributed the species to Hampson. It is found on Borneo, Sumatra and Peninsular Malaysia, with a type locality on Sumatra.

Food sources
The larvae feed on Plectocomiopsis geminiflorus. A survey in 2013 found that adults are attracted to bait traps with fermenting banana, and were the only species of Drepanidae recorded in the survey to prefer them over bait traps with rotting prawn.

Appearance
Euphalacra semisecta has pale forewings marked with interrupted brown bands and rounded anterior corners.

References

Moths described in 1922
Drepaninae